The 1992 Boise State Broncos football team represented Boise State University in the 1992 NCAA Division I-AA football season. The Broncos competed in the Big Sky Conference and played their home games at Bronco Stadium in Boise, Idaho. Led by sixth-year head coach Skip Hall, Boise State finished the season 5–6 overall and 3–4 in conference.

Hall resigned following BSU's eleventh consecutive loss to rival Idaho, and he became the defensive coordinator at Missouri.

Schedule

References

Boise State
Boise State Broncos football seasons
Boise State Broncos football